Acacia lycopodiifolia is a shrub belonging to the genus Acacia and the subgenus Lycopodiifoliae. It is native to an area in the Northern Territory and the Kimberley region of Western Australia.

It blooms from January to September and produces yellow flowers.

See also
List of Acacia species

References

lycopodiifolia
Acacias of Western Australia